The 2001 UMass Minutemen football team represented the University of Massachusetts Amherst in the 2001 NCAA Division I-AA football season as a member of the Atlantic 10 Conference.  The team was coached by Mark Whipple and played its home games at Warren McGuirk Alumni Stadium in Hadley, Massachusetts. The 2001 season was a difficult one for the Minutemen, as they collected their first losing record since the 1997 season. UMass finished the season with a record of 3–8 overall and 3–6 in conference play.

Schedule

References

UMass
UMass Minutemen football seasons
UMass Minutemen football